Luis Mariano Montemayor (born 16 March 1956) is an Argentinian prelate of the Catholic Church who has worked in the diplomatic service of the Holy See since 1991. He began to serve in his present position as Apostolic Nuncio to Ireland in February of 2023. 

Prior to this, He has served as the Apostolic Nuncio to Colombia from September 2018 to February 2023, Apostolic Nuncio to the Democratic Republic of the Congo from 2015 to 2018 and to Senegal, Cape Verde, and Guinea Bissau, as well as Apostolic Delegate to Mauritania from 2008 to 2015.

He was the second Argentine to be named a nuncio, after Leonardo Sandri.

Biography 
Born in Buenos Aires on 16 March 1956, Montemayor was ordained as a priest on 15 November 1985. After earning a degree in canon law he entered the diplomatic service of the Holy See on 1 July 1991 and worked in Ethiopia, Brazil, and Thailand. 

On 19 June 2008 he was appointed the titular archbishop of Illici and Apostolic Nuncio to Senegal and Cabo Verde, as well as Apostolic Delegate to Mauritania. On 17 September of that year he was also appointed Apostolic Nuncio to Guinea-Bissau.

He received his episcopal consecration on 6 August 2008 in Buenos Aires from Archbishop Dominique Mamberti.

On 22 June 2015, Pope Francis named him Apostolic Nuncio to the Democratic Republic of the Congo.

On 27 September 2018, Pope Francis named him Apostolic Nuncio to Colombia.

On 25 February 2023, he was named Apostolic Nuncio to Ireland.

See also
 List of heads of the diplomatic missions of the Holy See

References

1956 births
Living people
Roman Catholic titular archbishops
Apostolic Nuncios to Cape Verde
Apostolic Nuncios to the Democratic Republic of the Congo
Apostolic Nuncios to Guinea-Bissau
Apostolic Nuncios to Senegal
Apostolic Nuncios to Colombia
Apostolic Nuncios to Ireland
Diplomats of the Holy See